Forget the Alamo: The Rise and Fall of an American Myth is a 2021 history book written by the American authors Bryan Burrough, Chris Tomlinson, and Jason Stanford. It examines the story of the Battle of the Alamo, and argues that the heroic story of its defenders during the Texas Revolution is not accurate, and that it was not the important battle that it is often considered in Texas history lessons.

References 

2021 non-fiction books
Texas Revolution
History books about Texas
History of San Antonio
Penguin Press books